The Green Party of Canada fielded several candidates in the 2000 federal election, none of whom was elected.  Information about these candidates may be found on this page.

Ontario

Doug Howat (Eglinton—Lawrence)

Howat was a student at Northern Secondary School at the time of the election.  He received 688 votes (1.66%), finishing fifth against Liberal incumbent Joe Volpe.

Thomas Gerry (Sudbury)

Gerry was 52 years old at the time of the election, and worked as a professor of Canadian Literature at Laurentian University.  He favoured a shorter work week, and argued that Canada should shift its tax burden from small independent businesses to large national and multinational corporations.  He received 503 votes (1.45%), finishing fifth against Liberal incumbent Diane Marleau.

Gerry is the author of Contemporary Canadian and U.S. women of letters : an annotated bibliography.  He attended the Summit of the Americas protest at Quebec City in April 2001.

References

 
Green Party of Canada candidates in Canadian Federal elections
candidates in the 2000 Canadian federal election